Ophonus sabulicola is a species of ground beetle in the subfamily Harpalinae, genus Ophonus, and subgenus Ophonus (Ophonus).

References

sabulicola
Beetles described in 1796